Netanyahu ("Yah/God has given") is a surname.

 Benjamin Netanyahu (born 1949), Prime Minister of Israel 1996–1999 and 2009–2021, 2022–present
 Benzion Netanyahu (1910–2012), Israeli historian and father of Benjamin Netanyahu
 Elisha Netanyahu (1912–1986), Israeli mathematician at the Technion and uncle of Benjamin Netanyahu
 Iddo Netanyahu (born 1952), Israeli physician and author, brother of Benjamin Netanyahu
 Nathan Netanyahu (born 1951), professor of computer science at Bar-Ilan University, and cousin of Benjamin Netanyahu
 Sara Netanyahu (born 1958), wife of Benjamin Netanyahu
 Shoshana Netanyahu (born 1923), former Israel Supreme Court justice, and aunt (by marriage) of Benjamin Netanyahu
 Yair Netanyahu (born 1991), son of Benjamin Netanyahu
 Yonatan Netanyahu (1946–1976), Israeli special forces commander killed in Operation Entebbe, and brother of Benjamin Netanyahu

Variations of the name include Netanyah and Netanya.

See also
 Nathaniel
 Netanya
 Matthew (given name)

Hebrew-language surnames
Jewish surnames